Fouad Ali (born 6 March 1936) is an Egyptian wrestler. He competed in the men's Greco-Roman flyweight at the 1964 Summer Olympics.

References

External links
 

1936 births
Living people
Egyptian male sport wrestlers
Olympic wrestlers of Egypt
Wrestlers at the 1964 Summer Olympics
Sportspeople from Cairo
20th-century Egyptian people